Gazzo may refer to:

Places
Italy
 Gazzo, Veneto, a town in the Province of Padua, Veneto
 Gazzo Veronese, a town in the Province of Verona, Veneto
 Gazzo di Bigarello, a village in the Province of Mantua, Lombardy
 Monte Gazzo, a hill near the town of Sestri Ponente, Liguria

People
 Gazzo (magician) (b. 1960), British street magician
Gazzo (producer) (b. 1990), American DJ and producer
 Jane Gazzo (b. 1977), Australian broadcaster
 Michael V. Gazzo (1923-1995), American actor and Broadway playwright